Renée Watson may refer to
 Renée Watson (author) (born 1978), American teaching artist and author of children's books
 Renée Watson (scientist), science communicator and entrepreneur